A dunk tank, also known as a dunking booth or dunking machine, is a common feature at Canadian and American fairs, fundraisers, and celebrations. It consists of a huge water tank with a volunteer sitting on a collapsible bench above. When the ball hits the goal, the seat collapses and "dunks" the volunteer into the water. People often volunteer to be dunked while fully dressed for comedic effect.

Origin
African dodger, also known as Hit the Coon, was a popular American carnival game from the late 19th century up to the mid-1940s. It involved an African-American man sticking his head out through a hole in a curtain and trying to dodge balls thrown at him. Hits were rewarded with prizes. People were sometimes seriously injured or reportedly even killed after being struck. In response to attempts to ban it, a less dangerous game was invented: the African dip, in which a person was dropped into a tank of water if a target was hit by a ball. Popular Mechanics noted in 1910 that African dodger had become "too old and commonplace" and was being replaced with dunk tanks, in which an African American would fall into a tank of water when a target was hit with a ball. The illustration accompanying the article shows a game labeled "Drop the Chocolate Drop" and is captioned "Amusing to All but the Victim".

The African Dip is recognized today as overtly racist. One variant, at Chicago's Riverview amusement park, was named "Dunk the Nigger" until the early 1950s, when it was renamed African Dip. It was successfully shut down by the NAACP in the mid 1950s.

Safety
General safety guidelines include keeping hands off any part of the tank assembly—some rental companies recommend that the volunteer keep their hands on their lap when sitting on a dunk tank. Grasping the seat could result in pinched fingers when the seat falls, and holding on to the side of the tank or enclosure could cause arm or shoulder injuries when falling in. There is also a slight risk of slipping on the bottom of the tank, so some rental companies recommend wearing shoes or sandals. Participants are typically recommended to sit on the edge of the seat as to avoid tailbone and back injuries.

In 2016, Canadian TV personality Leslie Horton filed a $150,000 lawsuit after she struck her head on an unpadded part of a dunk tank while at a fair put on by the Calgary Police Association on July 4, 2014.

See also
 Cucking stool, a medieval form of punishment involving dipping the victim in water

References

External links
 

Ball games
Carnival games
North American culture